The Werra Group is a geologic group in Germany. It preserves fossils dating back to the Permian period.

See also

 List of fossiliferous stratigraphic units in Germany

References
 

Geologic groups of Europe
Permian System of Europe
Geologic formations of Poland
Permian Germany